Capparis crotonantha is a species of plant in the Capparaceae family. It is endemic to Panama.

References

Endemic flora of Panama
crotonantha
Data deficient plants
Taxonomy articles created by Polbot
Plants described in 1929